Bourdieria is an extinct genus of marine snails, gastropod mollusks in the family Neritiliidae.

Species
Species within the genus Bourdieria include:
 † Bourdieria faviai Lozouet, 2004

References

 Lozouet P. (2004). The European Tertiary Neritiliidae (Mollusca, Gastropoda, Neritopsina): indicators of tropical submarine cave environments and freshwater faunas. Zoological Journal of the Linnean Society. 140: 447–467.

Neritiliidae
Monotypic gastropod genera